The Wester Pipe Railway is a narrow gauge railway that mainly runs from Hastigrow on the B876 road to Mybster on the A9, all within Caithness. The line is double track for most of the route and uses Metre gauge. It is used to transport pipeline segments to the sea. It is the second northernmost railway in the United Kingdom with the first being the spur to Thurso on the Far North Line.

Route 
The line starts in Hastigrow Runs down crossing with the far north line in Mains of Watten before passing straight through Watten itself. Then it heads west towards the Houstry of Dunn before heading South-West to Mybster, not following the route of the B870. Around Halfway through the route there's a small depot and an area full of many resurfacing pipelines. There is an additional spur from Hastigrow to Bridge of Wester on the coast, by the port of Subsea 7.

Operations 
The railway is owned and operated by Subsea 7, who operate the railway and the pipelines around it to their port in Westerloch near Wick. The railway uses ocean going tugs to operated. Pipeline segments are combined at a site on the inland end of the railway and then towed to the sea, using the vessels. The individual pipes are often brought to Scotland by train as well. They are transported onto the railway by being taken to Georgemas Junction and then finish their journey to the Subsea 7 site by road. Entire pipelines are transported along the rail, giving it the record for the longest thing ever to be transported by rail: a 7.7 km long pipe, only 100 metres shorter than the main section of railway itself. Many of the tracks were re-laid in 2014.

References 

Metre gauge railways in the United Kingdom
Narrow gauge railways in Scotland
Year of establishment missing
Buildings and structures in Caithness